MSSB may refer to:

 Metropolitan Separate School Board, the former name for the Toronto Catholic District School Board
 MSSB (Modified Statutory Solvency Basis), an actuarial method of Deferred Acquisition Costs in the insurance industry
 MacArthur Story Stem Battery (MSSB), a form of psychological testing
 Missile Servicing and Storage Building (MSSB), a specialist building at RAF Scampton in the 1950s